Richard Stránsky (born 19 March 1991) is a Slovak football goalkeeper who currently plays for Slovakian 2. Liga club ŠKF Sereď.

Club career

FC Nitra
He made his professional debut for FC Nitra against ŠK Slovan Bratislava on 10 March 2014.

References

External links
Corgoň Liga profile

1991 births
Living people
Slovak footballers
Association football goalkeepers
FC Nitra players
Slovak Super Liga players